Glynn Washington (born 1970) is a media personality and producer. He is the host, creator and executive producer of Snap Judgment, a radio / podcast/ stage / television show distributed by PRX.

Early life and education
Washington was born in Detroit, Michigan, in 1970. He and his family moved to a farm in rural Michigan. He was raised in the apocalyptic religious cult, the Worldwide Church of God (now called Grace Communion International).

Washington studied at Grand Valley State University, the Japan Center For Michigan Universities in Hikone, Japan, and received a bachelor's degree in political science and Asian studies from the University of Michigan in 1992. In 1996 he received his Juris Doctor from the University of Michigan Law School.

Career
Washington won the Public Radio Talent Quest sponsored by Public Radio Exchange (PRX) and the Corporation for Public Broadcasting (CPB), which had more than 1,400 entries. Shortly after winning, he developed the Snap Judgment radio program, which first aired on NPR stations nationwide in July 2010. By May 2018, Snap Judgment was aired on over 400 public radio stations and downloaded over two million times each month.

Inspired by Snap Judgment'''s popular annual Halloween specials, in 2017 Washington launched the Snap Judgment spinoff podcast, Spooked. The program quickly soared to the top of the podcast charts and was named one of the “Top 10 New Podcasts of 2017” by Podtrac. 

“The response to Spooked proved overwhelming and a real testament to how much we love the unknown,” said Washington. “There’s nothing scarier or more mesmerizing than a real-life ghost story. These encounters stay with listeners beyond each episode and ask audiences to question their own reality.”

Inspired by his own experience growing up in an apocalyptic cult, In 2018 Washington joined forces with Pineapple Street Studios to create the popular Heaven's Gate podcast -- which later became the basis of HBO Max's docuseries Heaven's Gate: The Cult of Cults. 

Washington recently announced that while the Snap Judgment LIVE'' touring show was on hiatus due to the pandemic -- he looked forward to an international tour, "in the immediate future!" 

From 2007 until 2010 Washington was the Director of Young Entrepreneurs at Haas (YEAH), a Center within University of California, Berkeley's Haas School of Business.

References

Living people
1970 births
Haas School of Business faculty
NPR personalities
University of Michigan Law School alumni